Garraun at , is the 224th–highest peak in Ireland on the Arderin scale, however, while it is just short of the elevation threshold of 600-metres for other classifications (e.g. Vandeleur-Lynam, and Hewitt), it does have the prominence to be a Marilyn.  Garraun lies on an isolated massif near the mouth of Killary Harbour at the far north sector of the Twelve Bens/Garraun Complex Special Area of Conservation in the Connemara National Park in Galway. The southern slopes are a scenic backdrop to Kylemore Abbey and Kylemore Lough.

Naming

Tim Robinson notes that , meaning "bald hill", is the more common name in the area; it more correctly describes the shape of the summit of Garraun; while  likely refers to the sharp eastern ridge that descends to Lough Fee.

Tempan notes that the townland on the south slopes of Garraun South Top, that runs to Kylemore Lough, is called "Lemnaheltia" (meaning "the doe's leap"), and this name appears on Mercator's map of Ireland (1595) as Dosleape for the mountain (or the cliffs below the summit).  A legend tells of Fionn Mac Cumhail's dog Bran, who pursued a doe in this area, however, when the doe leapt from the summit, Bran fell from the cliff into the lake.  Many Irish places claim variations of this story, including "Lough Brin" (meaning "Bran's lake") south of the MacGillycuddy Reeks, in Kerry.

Geography

Garraun is a flat featureless summit that lies on its own isolated massif close to the entrance to Killary Harbour, Ireland's largest fjord, and is part of the Twelve Bens/Garraun Complex special area of conservation in Connemara; the Garraun massif is considered part of the Twelve Bens mountain range.  

To the west of Garraun, via a high ridge, is the subsidiary peak of Garraun South Top , which overlooks Kylemore Lough, and whose prominence of  qualifies it as an Arderin.  Further west, is the sharp summit of Garraun South-West Top , whose prominence of  qualifies it as an Arderin Beg.  Garraun South-West Top is marked "Altnagaighera" (or "ravine of the sheep"), on some maps.  Altnagaighera is noted for its conglomerate Tors that are scattered around its summit. 

Further southwest again, lies the double-top summit of Doughruagh  (meaning "black stack"), which directly overlooks Kylemore Abbey (and thus features in photographs and paintings of the abbey), and whose prominence of  qualifies it as an Arderin, and a Marilyn.  Half-way up the south face of Doughraugh, on very steep ground, is a statue of the Sacred Heart, erected in 1932 by the Benedictine nuns of Kylemore Abbey, in thanks for their safe delivery from their previous home in Ypres in Belgium, which they had to abandon during World War One. 

East of Garraun is a long sharp spur (which Tempan thinks was probably ), leading to Lough Fee.  To the north of Garraun is  Benchoona   (meaning "peak of Cuanna"), whose prominence of  qualifies it as an Arderin.  Benchoona has a subsidiary peak, Benchoona East Top  , whose prominence of  qualifies it as an Arderin Beg.  Robert Macfarlane described Benchoona's summit as "a rough broken tableland of flat rocks, perhaps a quarter of an acre in area, and planed smooth by the old ice".

Garraun has two satellite peaks.  To the east, across Lough Fee, is the isolated peak of Letterettrin   (meaning "hillside of furrows"), which is also called  (meaning "big peak"; not to be confused with Binn Mhór in the Maumturks range), and whose prominence of  qualifies it as a Marilyn.  To the west is Currywongaun  (meaning "Uí Mhongáin's round or pointed hill").

Hill walking

The most straightforward route to climb Gaurran is via its sharp east spur at Lough Fee; the 5-kilometre 2.5-hour round trip uses the car-park at the distinctively roofed Creeragh Church, off the N59 road.

Another recommended trail is the 9-kilometre 4-hour Lettergesh Loop or Benchoona Horseshoe, that starts from Lettergesh Beach in the car-park at Carrickglass (L737 630), taking the path to Cloonagh, and climbing a loop around Benchoona, Garraun, and Garraun South-West Top (or Altnagaighera) before returning via Cloonagh.

Various other 8-10 kilometre 4-5 hour routes, take in the summit of Doughruagh, and the shores of Kylemore Lough and Pollacappul Lough, in a loop with Garraun and Altnagaighera.

Gallery

Bibliography

See also

Twelve Bens
Mweelrea, major range in Killary Harbour
Maumturks, major range in Connemara
List of Irish counties by highest point
Lists of mountains in Ireland
List of Marilyns in the British Isles

References

External links
MountainViews: The Irish Mountain Website, Garraun
MountainViews: Irish Online Mountain Database
The Database of British and Irish Hills , the largest database of British Isles mountains ("DoBIH")
Hill Bagging UK & Ireland, the searchable interface for the DoBIH

Marilyns of Ireland
Hewitts of Ireland
Mountains and hills of County Galway
Highest points of Irish counties
Mountains under 1000 metres